Hana Dariusová (born 30 April 1973) is a Czech rower. She competed at the 1992 Summer Olympics in Barcelona for Czechoslovakia with the women's eight where she came eighth. At the 1996 Summer Olympics in Atlanta, she competed for the Czech Republic in the coxless pair where they came ninth.

Dariusová is married to the rower and coach John Parker who had also competed at the 1992 Summer Olympics.

References

1973 births
Living people
Czech female rowers
Olympic rowers of Czechoslovakia
Olympic rowers of the Czech Republic
Rowers at the 1992 Summer Olympics
Rowers at the 1996 Summer Olympics
People from Hořovice
Sportspeople from the Central Bohemian Region